The 1973 Drexel Dragons football team was an American football team that represented Drexel University as an independent during the 1973 NCAA Division II football season ]. In their fifth year under head coach Sterling Brown, the team compiled an overall record of 4–4.

Schedule

References

Drexel
Drexel Dragons football seasons
Drexel Dragons football